Vardøger, also known as vardyvle or vardyger, is  a spirit predecessor in Scandinavian folklore.

Stories typically include instances that are nearly déjà vu in substance, but in reverse, where a spirit with the subject's footsteps, voice, scent, or appearance and overall demeanor precedes them in a location or activity, resulting in witnesses believing they've seen or heard the actual person before the person physically arrives. This bears a subtle difference from a doppelgänger, with a less sinister connotation. It has been likened to being a phantom double, or form of bilocation. In Finnish folklore, the concept is known as etiäinen.

Etymology
Vardøgr  is a Norwegian word defined as ‘‘premonitory sound or sight of a person before he arrives’’. Originally, vardøger was considered a fylgja, a sort of guardian spirit.

References

Other sources
 Davidson, H.R. Ellis  (1965) Gods and Myths of Northern Europe  (Penguin Books) 
Kvideland,  Reimund; Henning K. Sehmsdorf  (1989) Scandinavian Folk Belief and Legend  (University of Minnesota Press) 
 McKinnell, John  (2005) Meeting the Other in Norse Myth and Legend  (D.S. Brewer, Cambridge) 
Orchard, Andy (1997) Dictionary of Norse Myth and Legend (Cassell & Co) 
Pulsiano,  Phillip; Kirsten Wolf    (1993)  Medieval Scandinavia: An Encyclopedia (Routledge Encyclopedias of the Middle Ages) 
Simek, Rudolf; translated by Angela Hall (2007) Dictionary of Northern Mythology  (D.S. Brewer, Cambridge) 
Steiger, Brad; (2003) Real Ghosts, Restless Spirits, and Haunted Places (Visible Ink Press, Detroit, Michigan)

Further reading
 Doubles: The Enigma of the Second Self, Rodney Davies, 1998, 
 Dogs That Know When Their Owners Are Coming Home: And Other Unexplained Powers of Animals, Rupert Sheldrake, 2000, 
 Phone Calls From the Dead [chapter on "intention" phone calls], D. Scott Rogo and Raymond Bayless, 1980,

External links
 
 Llewellyn Unconscious in the Astral
 

Scandinavian legendary creatures
Paranormal
Forteana
Supernatural legends
Counterparts